Venera 2MV-1 No.1, also known as Sputnik 19 in the West, was a Soviet spacecraft, which was launched in 1962 as part of the Venera programme.

Due to a problem with its upper stage it failed to leave low Earth orbit, and reentered the atmosphere a few days later. It was the first of two Venera 2MV-1 spacecraft, both of which failed to leave Earth orbit.

Launch 

Venera 2MV-1 No.1 was launched at 02:18:45 UTC on 25 August 1962, atop a Molniya 8K78 carrier rocket flying from Site 1/5 at the Baikonur Cosmodrome. The first three stages of the rocket operated nominally, injecting the fourth stage and payload into a low Earth orbit. The fourth stage then coasted until one hour and fifty seconds after launch, when it fired its ullage motors in preparation for ignition. One of the ullage motors failed to fire, and when the main engine ignited for a four-minute burn to place the spacecraft into heliocentric orbit, the stage began to tumble out of control. Forty-five seconds later, its engine cut off, leaving the spacecraft stranded in Earth orbit. It reentered the atmosphere on 28 August 1962, three days after it had been launched.

Spacecraft designation 

The designations Sputnik 23, and later Sputnik 19 was used by the United States Naval Space Command to identify the spacecraft in its Satellite Situation Summary documents, since the Soviet Union did not release the internal designations of its spacecraft at that time, and had not assigned it an official name due to its failure to depart geocentric orbit.

See also

 List of missions to Venus

References

Venera program
Spacecraft launched in 1962
1962 in the Soviet Union
Spacecraft which reentered in 1962
2MV